LLCC may mean:
 Lincoln Land Community College, Springfield, Illinois, USA
 Lindbergh LaVista Corridor Coalition, Atlanta, Georgia, USA; see Lindridge/Martin Manor
 Low-level circulation center, part of a tropical cyclone